Adela caeruleella, the southern longhorn moth, is a moth of the family Adelidae or fairy longhorn moths. It was described by Francis Walker in 1863. It is found in North America, including Alabama, Arkansas, Florida, Illinois, Kentucky, Louisiana, Maryland, Mississippi, North Carolina, Ohio, Oklahoma, Pennsylvania, South Carolina, Tennessee, Texas, Virginia and West Virginia.

Adults have been recorded on wing in March in Florida, from April to May northward and in August in Quebec.

References

Adelidae
Moths described in 1863
Moths of North America
Taxa named by Francis Walker (entomologist)